John O'Hare (born 24 September 1946) is a Scottish former footballer. O'Hare's clubs included Sunderland, Derby County, Leeds United and also Nottingham Forest and was part of their European Cup victory in 1980, coming on as a substitute in the final. O'Hare also won thirteen caps for the Scotland national team, scoring five goals.

Early years
Born in Renton, West Dunbartonshire, he attended St Martins School and then went on to St Patrick's High School in Dumbarton.

Career

Sunderland
O'Hare started his senior career with Sunderland, playing for the first team between 1964 and 1967.

Derby County

He then moved to Derby County for £20,000 in 1967. There was initial criticism of him as he was seen as a large but slow striker, however, their manager Brian Clough, who had coached him at Sunderland, persisted with him and in his second season he justified his fee, establishing a strike partnership with Kevin Hector as they led the Rams to the 1971–72 Football League First Division title.

At County, O'Hare won thirteen caps for the Scotland national team, scoring five goals.

After Clough's departure he fell out of favour with his successor, and former Derby captain, Dave Mackay.

Leeds United
O'Hare followed Clough from Derby to Leeds United in 1974 alongside John McGovern for £125,000, however Clough left Leeds after only 44 days.

Nottingham Forest
O'Hare and McGovern re-united with Clough at Nottingham Forest in February 1975 for a combined fee of £130,000. Forest were promoted to the top flight at the end of the 1976–77 season. In their first season back-up, Forest won the league by seven points (two points for a win) and won the 1979 European Cup Final the following season.

In the 1977–78 season O'Hare played football in the North American Soccer League for Dallas Tornado, with forty appearances and 14 goals.

Later career
O'Hare later worked as a part-time chauffeur for Toyota and as a host of the executive/VIP guest suite at Nottingham Forest's home games.

Career statistics

As a player

A.  The "Other" column constitutes appearances and goals in the FA Charity Shield, Anglo-Scottish Cup, Football League Trophy, Watney Cup, Texaco Cup, European Super Cup and Intercontinental Cup.

International appearances

International goals

Scores and results list Scotland's goal tally first

Honours
Derby County

First Division: 1971–72
Second Division: 1968–69
Texaco Cup: 1971–72
Watney Cup: 1970

Nottingham Forest

First Division: 1977–78
League Cup: 1977–78, 1978–79
Anglo-Scottish Cup: 1976–77
FA Charity Shield: 1978
European Cup: 1978–79, 1979–80
European Super Cup: 1979

References

External links
http://www.valeofleven.org.uk/famousfolk/johnohare.html
http://www.nasljerseys.com/Players/O/O'Hare.John.htm

1946 births
Living people
Scottish footballers
Scotland international footballers
Sunderland A.F.C. players
Derby County F.C. players
Leeds United F.C. players
Dallas Tornado players
Nottingham Forest F.C. players
Belper Town F.C. players
English Football League players
Scotland under-23 international footballers
Scottish expatriate footballers
Vancouver Royals players
United Soccer Association players
North American Soccer League (1968–1984) players
Expatriate soccer players in Canada
Expatriate soccer players in the United States
Association football forwards
Scottish expatriate sportspeople in the United States
Scottish expatriate sportspeople in Canada
UEFA Champions League winning players
People from Renton, West Dunbartonshire
Footballers from West Dunbartonshire